King Khan may refer to:

Genghis Khan, Mongol Empire founder ruler and Great Khan
King Khan (musician), Canadian musician, frontman of the bands King Khan and the Shrines and The King Khan & BBQ Show
Shah Rukh Khan (born 1965), Indian actor informally known as King Khan
 Shakib Khan (born 1979), Bangladeshi actor, producer, singer, popularly referred as King Khan
Oliver Kahn (born 1969), former German football player (goalkeeper) nicknamed "King Kahn"
Shao Kahn, a boss and recurring playable character from the Mortal Kombat fighting game series
Khan Abdul Ghaffar Khan (1890–1988), Pashtun political and spiritual leader known for his non-violent opposition to British Rule in India and a close friend of Mahatma Gandhi
 Amir Khan (boxer), British boxer also known by the nickname King Khan

Entertainment
 King Khan (film), a Dhallywood film starring Shakib Khan